Der Golem (shown in the US as The Monster of Fate) is a partially lost 1915 German silent horror film written and directed by Paul Wegener and Henrik Galeen. It was inspired by a Jewish folktale, the most prevalent version of the story involving 16th century Rabbi Judah Loew ben Bezalel who created the Golem to protect his people from antisemites. Wegener claimed the film was based on Gustav Meyrink's 1915 novel The Golem, but, as the movie has little to do with existing Jewish traditions, Troy Howarth states "it is more likely that (the screenwriters) simply drew upon European folklore".

The film was the first of a trilogy produced by Wegener, followed by The Golem and the Dancing Girl (1917) and The Golem: How He Came into the World (1920).

Plot 
In modern times, an antiques dealer (Henrik Galeen) searching the ruins of a Jewish temple, finds a golem (Paul Wegener), a clay statue that had been brought to life four centuries earlier by a Kabbalist rabbi using a magical amulet to protect the Jewish people from persecution. The dealer resurrects the golem as a servant, but the golem falls in love with Jessica (Lyda Salmonova), the dealer's daughter. When she does not return his love, the golem goes on a rampage and commits a series of murders.

Cast 
Paul Wegener as Golem
Rudolf Blümner as Gelehrter
Carl Ebert as Troedler
Henrik Galeen as Troedler, the antiques dealer
Lyda Salmonova as Jessica
Robert A. Dietrich
Jakob Tiedtke

Production 
Co-writer/co-director Henrik Galeen played a major role in the film (which was unusual for him) and years later went on to co-create other silent horror classics, such as F. W. Murnau's Nosferatu (1922) and Paul Leni's Waxworks (1924)

Actress Lyda Salmanova went on to marry Paul Wegener.

The few surviving clips from this film show Wegener in a costume almost identical to the one he used in his later 1920 version, and "show him stumbling around in a manner he would repeat in the later film", according to Troy Howarth.

Reception

Preservation status 

The Deutsche Kinemathek film archive possesses "108 meter fragments". While many sources consider it a lost film, silentera.com states that a "print exists", and Professor Elizabeth Baer notes in her book The Golem Redux: From Prague to Post-Holocaust Fiction that Donald Glut claimed in The Frankenstein Legend that "European film collector" Paul Sauerlaender tracked down "a complete print" in 1958; Baer is careful, however, to point out that "Glut provides no source for this information."

Quotes in popular culture 
In Season 6, Episode 9 of the television show, Mad Men, Roger Sterling (John Slattery) refers to the film in conversation with his daughter. She admonishes Roger for taking his young grandson to see Planet of the Apes and Roger replies: "Listen, I saw "The Golem" when I was his age. You don't even know what scary is."

See also 

List of German films of 1895–1918
List of incomplete or partially lost films

References

External links 
 Fragments of 
 
 

1915 films
1915 horror films
German black-and-white films
1910s fantasy films
Films of the German Empire
Films directed by Paul Wegener
Golem films
German silent feature films
German horror films
Films directed by Henrik Galeen
German fantasy films
Silent horror films
Trilogies
1910s German films

es:Golem (película)